Acraea zonata is a butterfly in the family Nymphalidae. It is found in Malawi, Tanzania and Kenya.

Description

A. zonata Hew. (53 a). Wings brown-yellow with black veins and triangular black spots at the extremities of the veins; forewing with black costal margin, a large black spot in the celi, a discal and a submarginal curved transverse band, which are united at the hindmargin near the hinder angle; these transverse bands are continued on the hindwing by a single band which runs somewhat behind the middle. A rare species, hitherto only met with in German and British East Africa.

Taxonomy
It is a member of the Acraea satis species group - but see also Pierre & Bernaud, 2014

References

External links

Images representing Acraea zonata at Bold
Acraea zonata at Pteron

Butterflies described in 1877
zonata
Butterflies of Africa
Taxa named by William Chapman Hewitson